Bethlehem Baptist Church is a historic Baptist church building at Wall and Gilmore Streets in Barnwell, South Carolina.

The Eclectic style building was constructed in 1898 and added to the National Register of Historic Places in 1979.

References

Baptist churches in South Carolina
Churches on the National Register of Historic Places in South Carolina
Churches completed in 1898
19th-century Baptist churches in the United States
Churches in Barnwell County, South Carolina
National Register of Historic Places in Barnwell County, South Carolina
1898 establishments in South Carolina